Tudor Evans  is a British Labour Co-operative politician who has been the leader of Plymouth City Council four times. Since 2021 he has been the leader of the opposition. He has been a councillor for Ham ward since 1988 and has led the Labour group on Plymouth City Council since 1998. He served as leader of the council from 1998 to 2000, from 2003 to 2007, from 2012 to 2016, and 2018 to 2021.

Early life

Evans was born in Ebbw Vale in Wales. He moved to Plymouth as an undergraduate, studying environmental science. He was a director of a co-operative printing company for thirteen years, and works as a local government consultant.

Political career

Evans first stood for election to Plymouth City Council in 1987 in Sutton and Mount Gould ward, losing to SDP–Liberal Alliance candidates. He was subsequently elected as a councillor to Ham ward in 1988, a seat he has held ever since.

After the 1998 local election, the Labour group leader John Ingham stood down, having led the council for seven years. Evans was subsequently elected as th;e leader of the Labour group, saying he wanted to prioritise investment, jobs and the tourism industry. He led the council until 2000, when the Conservatives won a majority of seats on the council.

Evans became council leader again in 2003, crediting his victory to Conservative plans to close old people's homes. When Labour lost its majority in 2007, he said he was "proud of what [his] council has achieved", but "puzzled" at having lost control.

Labour again took control of the council in 2012, with the defeated Conservative council leader Vivien Pengelly blaming a cut in the top rate of income tax and the proposed pasty tax from the Conservative chancellor of the Exchequer George Osborne's budget. Evans again returned as council leader on a platform including job creation, webcasting council meetings, and trying to stop the construction of an incinerator. He said he was not opposed to the incinerator, but to the planned location. In 2013, the council established an energy co-operative called Plymouth Energy Community. In 2014, he was a signatory to an open letter to The Observer calling for an end to cuts to local government. He advocated for Plymouth to be included in a national policy of compensation for businesses affected by flooding.

The party lost control after the 2015 election, which left the council under no overall control. Evans initally remained council leader. He was removed from that post after the 2016 local elections, with local UK Independence Party councillors forming a coalition with the Conservatives. During this time, Evans supported a cross-party campaign for Plymouth to retain its warships.

After Labour restored its majority in the 2018 council election, Evans returned as council leader with a manifesto including pledges to create a thousand new parking spaces and to construct new low-cost homes. Evans opposed plans to merge Devon and Cornwall Police with Dorset Police. Labour lost the 2021 council election, and Evans was replaced by the Conservative councillor Nick Kelly as council leader.

Honours and awards 
Evans was named council leader of the year in 2015. He was made an Officer of the Order of the British Empire for services to politics and local government in January 2016.

References

External links
 Profile at Plymouth City Council

Living people
Labour Party (UK) councillors
People from Ebbw Vale
Alumni of the University of Plymouth
Councillors in Devon
Officers of the Order of the British Empire
Year of birth missing (living people)
Leaders of local authorities of England